Macrocheles scutatus is a species of mite in the family Macrochelidae. It is found in New Zealand.

References

scutatus
Articles created by Qbugbot
Animals described in 1904